WHTO (106.7 FM, "The Mountain") is a radio station broadcasting a classic hits format. Licensed to Iron Mountain, Michigan, it first began broadcasting in 2003. The station's programming is delivered via satellite from Westwood One's Kool Gold network.

Sources
Michiguide.com - WHTO History

External links
The Mountain WHTO Facebook

HTO-FM
Classic hits radio stations in the United States
Radio stations established in 2003